Sara Zwangobani  is an Australian actress. She rose to prominence portraying Marigold Brandyfoot in Amazon Prime Video's The Lord of the Rings: The Rings of Power in 2022. She has also appeared in Australian TV and film in Love My Way and Monarch Cove (2006), All Saints (2005 & 2009), Nightmares & Dreamscapes: From the Stories of Stephen King (2006), Disgrace (2008), Packed to the Rafters’’ (2009), Soul Mates (2014), Home and Away and Doctor Doctor (2019).

Early life
Zwangobani was born in Canberra, New South Wales, Australia, and brought up in Cook. She has a Zimbabwean father and a Zulu surname and a sibling, brother Elliott Zwangobani, Australian Sports Commission director, a former futsal player. She attended Cook Primary School, then undertook a drama program at Hawker College, Canberra. From 1985-1988, she trained in dance, many forms, such as ballet, jazz, modern, funk  and as a tap dancer, at Betsy Sawyer’s School of Dance, and with the Human Veins Dance Theatre. In 1989,  undertook a Television and Film Workshops course at Broadway Film Studios in Canberra.
She furthered her education at the Victorian College of the Arts, graduating in 1992 with a Diploma of arts in dramatic arts (Acting).

Career
Theatre
On graduating, Zwangobani was approached by actor John Howard for acting roles for the Sydney Theatre Company. Performances include Summer of the Aliens, The Crucible  (2000), Women in Shorts (1997), Pulse 10 (1999), Imago (2001). Girl in Tan Boots for the Griffin Theatre Company, Lyrebird for the Old Fitzroy Theatre, Dirty Butterfly. Zwangobani played Mark Antony in Julius Caesar In 2009, she played Rosetta in the  Liv Ullmann directed A Streetcar Named Desire working with Cate Blanchett. In 2010, Zwangobani starred in the Sydney Theatre Company’s production of the Sarah Ruhl play In the Next Room (or The Vibrator Play) directed by Pamela Rabe. Zwangobani played Elizabeth, a wet nurse of the main character 

Television and film
In 1997, she made her debut appearance on television in an episode of Fallen Angels  In 2006, she starred as Imogen in six episodes of  the Australian drama series Love My Way, which won ‘Best Television Drama Series’ at the Australian Film Institute Awards that year. and won ‘Most Outstanding Drama Program’ at the ASTRA Awards 
Continuing in 2006, she had a recurring role as Detective Maria Ramos for seven episodes of Lifetime’s prime time telenovela Monarch Cove.
She made appearances on Australian television and film in All Saints (2005 & 2009), Nightmares & Dreamscapes: From the Stories of Stephen King (2006), Disgrace (2008), Packed to the Rafters’’ (2009), Soul Mates (2014), Home and Away and Doctor Doctor (2019).

In 2022, She played Marigold Brandyfoot, stepmother of Elanor (Nori) Brandyfoot, played by fellow Australian actress Markella Kavenagh, in Amazon Prime Video's The Lord of the Rings: The Rings of Power. Filming of season 1 was carried out in New Zealand.

Filmography

Film

Television

References

External links
 
instagram

21st-century Australian actresses
Living people
Actresses from Canberra
Australian film actresses
Australian people of Zimbabwean descent
Australian television actresses
Australian stage actresses
People educated at Hawker College
People of Zimbabwean descent